The 2010 Division 1 was contested by 28 teams divided into two groups geographically. Västerås SK and IFK Värnamo won their respective groups and were thereby qualified for play in the 2011 Superettan. Qviding FIF who finished second in the southern group were also promoted after winning their playoff.

League tables

North

South

Season statistics

Northern group top scorers

Southern group top scorers

Stars of Tomorrow all-star game
At the end of each Division 1 season an all-star game is played called "Morgondagens Stjärnor" (English: "Stars of Tomorrow"), contested by the best young players from each of the two groups.

References
Sweden - List of final tables (Clas Glenning)

Swedish Football Division 1 seasons
3
Sweden
Sweden